The 2nd constituency of the Sarthe is a French legislative constituency in the Sarthe département.

Geography 
The constituency is based in the centre of the department.

Deputies

Election results

2022

 
 
 
 
 
 
 
|-
| colspan="8" bgcolor="#E9E9E9"|
|-
 
 

 
 
 
 
 * PS dissident without the support of the NUPES alliance

2017

 
 
 
 
 
 
|-
| colspan="8" bgcolor="#E9E9E9"|
|-

2012

 
 
 
 
 
|-
| colspan="8" bgcolor="#E9E9E9"|
|-

2007

Sources
 

 French Interior Ministry results website:

References 

2